Sir Francis Grant  (18 January 1803 – 5 October 1878) was a Scottish portrait painter who painted Queen Victoria and many distinguished British aristocratic and political figures. He served as President of the Royal Academy.

Life
Grant was the fourth son of Francis Grant, Laird of Kilgraston, near Bridge of Earn, Perthshire, and his wife Anne Oliphant of Rossie. Grant was educated at Harrow School and Edinburgh High School.  His father, a plantation owner in Jamaica, died in 1818, leaving money to his seven children.

Initially Grant intended to become a lawyer, but he left his studies after a year, and took up painting. He possibly spent time in the Edinburgh studio of Alexander Nasmyth.

Grant through his second wife gained access to a clientele in the hunting set at Melton Mowbray, where he hunted himself, and took lessons with the artist John Ferneley. He acquired a reputation as a painter of sporting subjects, and in 1834 exhibited at the Royal Academy  a picture called Melton Breakfast which was engraved by Charles George Lewis. In 1840 he exhibited an equestrian group of Queen Victoria riding with Lord Melbourne and others in Windsor Park, and became the fashionable portrait-painter of the day. His portrait of Lady Glenlyon, exhibited in 1842, increased his reputation, and for nearly 40 years graceful portraits in the Royal Academy exhibitions came from his studio.

Elected an associate of the Royal Academy in 1842, Grant in 1851 became an academician. In 1866, on the death of Charles Eastlake, Edwin Landseer turned down the seat of Academy President, and Grant was elected instead. He was knighted that year.

Works
In March 1831 on a visit to Abbotsford House Grant painted a cabinet painting of Sir Walter Scott (now held by The National Galleries of Scotland accession number PG 103 ) for Scotts's friend Lady Ruthven. It depicts Scott at his desk, armour on the wall and his two noble staghounds Nimrod and Bran. Scott writing in his diary of Grant said "Frank will, I believe, if he attends to his profession, be one of the celebrated men of the age"
In 1837 Grant exhibited at the Royal Academy The Meeting of His Majesty's Staghounds on Ascot Heath, painted for the Earl of Chesterfield, and in 1839 The Melton Hunt, purchased by the Duke of Wellington (both of these were engraved, the former by Frederick Bromley, the latter by William Humphrys). In 1841, he painted A Shooting Party at Rawton Abbey for the Earl of Lichfield, and in 1848 The Cottesmore Hunt for Sir Richard Sutton.

Between 1834 and 1879 Grant contributed 253 works, many of which were full-length portraits, to the exhibitions of the Royal Academy. Among those were equestrian portraits of Queen Victoria and Albert, Prince Consort, painted for Christ's Hospital; the Prince of Wales; an equestrian group of the Duke and Duchess of Beaufort; Sidney Herbert, afterwards Lord Herbert of Lea; Lord John Russell, afterwards Earl Russell; Benjamin Disraeli, afterwards Earl of Beaconsfield; John Hick, afterwards MP for Bolton and Mrs Hick; General Sir James Hope Grant; Sir George Grey; Edward, earl of Derby, first lord of the treasury; Lord Clyde; Viscount Palmerston, painted for Harrow School; Viscount Gough; Lord Truro, lord high chancellor; Sir Frederick Pollock, lord chief baron; Sir William Erle, lord chief justice of the common pleas; John Sumner, archbishop of Canterbury; George Moberly, bishop of Salisbury; and John Gibson Lockhart.

His noted female portraits included those of the Marchioness of Waterford, exhibited in 1844, of the Marchioness of Bristol, and of Mrs Markham (his daughter Daisy Grant – see below), exhibited in 1857.

Last years and death
After some years of gradually failing health, Grant died of heart disease suddenly at his residence, The Lodge, Melton Mowbray, on 5 October 1878, and was interred in the Anglican cemetery, his relations having declined the usual honour of burial in St Paul's Cathedral. His funeral was conducted by the Archbishop of York on 12 October and many of the leading British artists attended, including Edward John Poynter, Edward Armitage, Thomas Woolner, Philip Hermogenes Calderon, and the American Albert Bierstadt.

Family

Grant married, firstly, Amelia Farquharson (died 1827), the daughter of a Scottish laird, in 1826; she died after giving birth to their son. He married again, in 1829, Isabella Elizabeth Norman, daughter of Richard Norman and his wife Lady Elizabeth Isabella, and a niece of John Manners, 5th Duke of Rutland; they had three sons and four daughters. Among the sons was Ferdinand Hope-Grant, a chaplain to the Prince of Wales. One of the daughters was Anne Emily Sophia Grant (also known as Daisy Grant or Mrs. Colonel William Thomas Markham), whose portrait, by her father, hangs in the National Gallery of Scotland, and has been noted for its depiction of Victorian womanhood.

Grant was the brother of General Sir James Hope Grant. Mary Grant, the eminent Victorian sculptress, was his niece.

References

External links

 
Francis Grant online (Artcyclopedia)
Lady Wearing Golden Bracelet (Oil on canvas)
Biography of Francis Grant (horsehints.org)
Portrait of Louisa Madeleine Keith-Falconer (Christie's)

Attribution

1803 births
1878 deaths
Knights Bachelor
People educated at Harrow School
People from Perth and Kinross
Royal Academicians
19th-century Scottish painters
Scottish male painters
Scottish portrait painters
19th-century Scottish male artists